Surinamese National Junior Badminton Championships is a yearly organized event by the Surinaamse Badminton Bond (SBB) the governing body for the sport of badminton in Suriname, to crown the best National badminton junior players in Suriname. It was locally called the "Open Jeugdkampioenschappen van Suriname".

The tournament started in 1968 and is held every year, except for the years 1971 and 1989 when no National championships were held. Since the year 1996 the National Championships of Suriname is divided between the different age categories for junior players Under-19 (U-19) years, Under 17 (U-17) years, Under 15 (U-15) years and Under 13 (U-13) years. In 2001 the Under 11 (U-11) age category was added. Furthermore a National Championships for adults is also organized every year since 1966. There also used to be yearly Surinamese National Badminton Club Championships for club teams held since 1964.

Title holders National Championships U-19 (was some years U-18 till 1996)

Title holders National Championships U-17 (was some years U-16 till 1996)

Title holders National Championships U-15 (was some years U-14 till 1996)

Title holders National Championships U-13 (was some years U-12 till 1996)

Title holders National Championships U-11

References

External links 
http://www.tournamentsoftware.com/sport/tournament.aspx?id=6F014E10-63CD-4F83-A382-4D7CC498EE06
http://www.tournamentsoftware.com/sport/winners.aspx?id=3007F53B-6F92-470B-8C00-0B25E45A134F
http://www.tournamentsoftware.com/sport/winners.aspx?id=C0AD2B53-6597-4ACC-86D0-65259E661DD2
http://www.tournamentsoftware.com/sport/tournament?id=DC5DCE1E-E05B-4AB3-BA82-5FB3C89D09C1
http://www.tournamentsoftware.com/sport/winners.aspx?id=56A8E34E-AA1C-4005-B850-B0A4BCA99BEF
http://www.tournamentsoftware.com/sport/winners.aspx?id=D48F3228-C694-41D6-9EA9-4E018D2E6470
http://www.tournamentsoftware.com/sport/winners.aspx?id=D43FDEEC-A67E-4455-B307-3DD501F4A488
http://www.tournamentsoftware.com/sport/winners.aspx?id=453C9583-8CE5-4313-B8E6-EB404B3FB917
http://www.dbnl.org/tekst/stut004eers01_01/stut004eers01_01_0015.php

Badminton tournaments in Suriname
Recurring sporting events established in 1968